The 1996 Scottish League Cup final was a football match played at Celtic Park, Glasgow, on 24 November 1996. It was the final of the 51st Scottish League Cup competition. The final was contested by Rangers and Heart of Midlothian, who had also been the participants in the 1996 Scottish Cup Final in May of that year.

Rangers won the match 4–3 thanks to two goals each by Ally McCoist and Paul Gascoigne; Steve Fulton, John Robertson and David Weir scored for Hearts.

Match details

References

External links 
 Soccerbase

1996
League Cup Final
Scottish League Cup Final 1996
Scottish League Cup Final 1996
1990s in Glasgow
November 1996 sports events in  the United Kingdom